George Edmond Mulholland (May 10, 1904 – April 2, 1971) was an American boxer who competed in the 1924 Summer Olympics. He was born and died Indianapolis, Indiana. In 1924 he was eliminated in the quarter-finals of the light heavyweight class after losing his fight to the upcoming silver medalist Thyge Petersen.

References

External links

1904 births
1971 deaths
Sportspeople from Indianapolis
Boxers from Indiana
Light-heavyweight boxers
Olympic boxers of the United States
Boxers at the 1924 Summer Olympics
American male boxers